The C&C 121, originally called the 121 Express at introduction, is an American sailboat, that was designed by Tim Jackett and entered production in 1999.

Production
The boat was built by C&C Yachts in the United States, but it is now out of production.

Design
The C&C 121 is a small recreational keelboat, built predominantly with a vinylester-corecell and E-glass with Kevlar. It has a masthead sloop rig, an internally-mounted spade-type rudder and a fixed fin keel. It displaces .

The design had a choice of keels.

The boat is fitted with a Volvo MD 2040 diesel inboard engine.

The boat has a PHRF racing average handicap of 63 with a high of 69 and low of 54.

See also
List of sailing boat types

References

Keelboats
1990s sailboat type designs
Sailing yachts
Sailboat type designs by Tim Jackett
Sailboat types built by C&C Yachts